Robert Drivas (born Robert Choromokos; November 21, 1935 – June 29, 1986) was an American actor and threatre director.

Life and early career 
Drivas was born Robert Choromokos in Coral Gables, Florida, the son of Hariklia (née Cunningham-Wright) and James Peter Choromokos. Drivas studied at the University of Chicago and the University of Miami with further training at the Greek Playhouse in Athens, Greece. He made his stage debut in Night Must Fall in Coral Gables, Florida, and then appeared in Tea and Sympathy in the role of Tom Lee at the Coconut Grove Playhouse in Miami, and in The Lady's Not for Burning, Death of a Salesman, Thieves' Ball, and A View from the Bridge at the Highland Park Playhouse in Chicago. According to Thomas W. Ennis writing in The New York Times, Tennessee Williams saw Drivas in Tea and Sympathy and asked him to take the lead in his play Sweet Bird of Youth, which had its premiere in Coconut Grove at George Keathley's Studio M Playhouse in 1956.

Broadway 
He made his Broadway debut in the role of Ramses in 1958 in the play The Firstborn, directed by and starring Anthony Quayle as Moses. He continued to perform on stage, as Jacko in the Beverley Cross play One More River (1960), with George C. Scott in the Warsaw Ghetto play The Wall (1960), as Alfred Drake's son Giorgio in the Italian Renaissance set Lorenzo (1963), as the British beatnik son of Cyril Ritchard in The Irregular Verb to Love (1963), and in And Things That Go Bump in the Night (1965), which he also directed. In 1963 he won a Theatre World Award for his performance in Mrs. Dally Has a Lover (opposite Estelle Parsons).

Drivas was associated with many well-known theatrical figures of his time. These included playwrights Terrence McNally, whose play The Ritz he directed in 1975, and Edward Albee, who directed Drivas in the 1983 premiere of Albee's harshly received play The Man Who Had Three Arms. Other directing credits include Bad Habits, for which he won an Obie Award, Legend, Cheaters, It Had to Be You, the 1982 revival of the musical Little Me (with his work there praised by theater critic Clive Barnes who wrote "The whole balance is set right by the present production's firmer sense of form and continuity. The sense once had of a series of black-out sketches has gone and the staging... is smooth, inventive, and comic.") and Peg, a musical biography of songstress Peggy Lee, with lyrics and book by the star herself.

Film and television 
Concurrent with his theater work, Drivas appeared in television, beginning in 1957, on such crime shows and dramas as Route 66, N.Y.P.D., The Defenders, The Fugitive, Twelve O'Clock High, The Wild Wild West, Hawaii Five-O, The Streets of San Francisco, and The F.B.I.

Drivas' first film appearance was in the role of Loudmouth Steve in Cool Hand Luke (1967). This debut led to more film work in The Illustrated Man (1969) and the generation-gap drama Where It's At (1969), written and directed by Garson Kanin.

Death 
Drivas died June 29, 1986, of AIDS-related complications at age 50.

Filmography

References

External links 

1935 births
1986 deaths
American male film actors
American male stage actors
American male television actors
University of Chicago alumni
University of Miami alumni
American gay actors
LGBT people from Florida
American people of Greek descent
Male actors from Chicago
AIDS-related deaths in New York (state)
American theatre directors
20th-century American male actors
20th-century American LGBT people